Egeda is a rural locality (a selo) in Tlogobsky Selsoviet, Gunibsky District, Republic of Dagestan, Russia. The population was 60 as of 2010.

Geography 
Egeda is located 45 km northwest of Gunib (the district's administrative centre) by road, on the Kudiyabor River. Amuarib and Shagalazda are the nearest rural localities.

Nationalities 
Avars live there.

References 

Rural localities in Gunibsky District